The girls' ski jumping event at the 2020 Winter Youth  Olympics was held on 19 January at the Les Tuffes Nordic Centre.

Results
The first round was started at 10:30 and the final round at 11:45.

References

Girls' individual